Darryl Bullock is a former American football coach and player. He served as the interim head football coach at North Carolina Central University for the final five games of the 2010 season, compiling a record of 1–4. Bullock played college football at Pennsylvania State University, where he was a member of the 1986 national championship team.

References

Year of birth missing (living people)
Living people
East Tennessee State Buccaneers football coaches
Elon Phoenix football coaches
Gardner–Webb Runnin' Bulldogs football coaches
Hampton Pirates football coaches
Michigan Wolverines football coaches
Morehead State Eagles football coaches
Morgan State Bears football coaches
North Carolina Central Eagles football coaches
New Hampshire Wildcats football coaches
Penn State Nittany Lions football coaches
Penn State Nittany Lions football players
Tennessee State Tigers football coaches
High school football coaches in Florida
African-American coaches of American football
African-American players of American football
21st-century African-American people